The Boston Directory of  Boston, Massachusetts, was first published in 1789. It contained "a list of the merchants, mechanics, traders, and others, of the town of Boston; in order to enable strangers to find the residence of any person." Also included were listings for public officials, doctors, bank directors, and firemen. The directory was issued annually after 1825; previously it had appeared irregularly.

The number of listings in each directory reflected fluctuations in the population size of Boston. In 1789, the directory included some 1,474 listings; by 1875, there were 126,769.

Publishers included John Norman (1789); John West (1796-1803); Edward Cotton (1805-1818); Charles Stimpson (1820-1846); George Adams (1846-1857); Adams, Sampson & Co. (1858-1865); Sampson, Davenport & Co. (1865-1884); Sampson, Murdock & Co. (1885-1903); Sampson & Murdock Co. (1904-ca.1930); R.L. Polk & Co. (1944-ca.1980).

Boston Directories

18th century

19th century

1800-1829

1830-1849

1850-1869

1870-1889

1890-1899

20th century

1900-1949

1950-1999

See also
 Boston Almanac and Business Directory
 Boston Register and Business Directory
 Massachusetts Register

References

Further reading
 New England historical and genealogical register. Oct. 1862; p. 387+
 Report of the record commissioners of the city of Boston, Volume 10. Rockwell and Churchill, 1886; p. 163+

External links
 HathiTrust. 1805 etc; 1849-1883
 damrellsfire.com
 Boston Athenæum: The Boston Directory 1789-1900 (Ongoing Project), Digital Collection.

History of Boston
Directories
Publications established in 1789
18th century in Boston
19th century in Boston
20th century in Boston
1789 establishments in Massachusetts
Books about Boston
City directories